Theo Hakola is a singer/songwriter/musician and novelist born (1954) and raised in Spokane, Washington USA. In 1978 he settled in Paris, France. He is of Finnish and Swedish descent.

Books
 Non romanesque, nonfiction and photos published in French by Les Fondeurs de Briques (May 2022)
 Over The Volcano, novel published in French translation by Actes Sud (March 2022) as Sur le volcan 
 The Snake Pit, novel published in French translation by Actes Sud (September 2016) as Idaho Babylone
 Rakia, novel published in French translation by Éditions Intervalles (2011)
 The Blood of Souls, novel published in French translation as Le Sang des âmes by Éditions Intervalles (2008)
 Blood Streams, novel published in French translation as La Valse des Affluents by Le Serpent à Plumes (2003) and in Finnish by WSOY (2005)
 The Way of Blood, novel published in French translation as La Route du Sang by Le Serpent à Plumes (2001) and in Finnish by WSOY (2002)

Music

Albums

Solo
 Water Is Wet (Wobbly Ashes Records/Microcultures/Médiapop Records, 2020) - https://microcultures-records.fr/artist/theo-hakola/
 I Fry Mine in Butter (Wobbly Ashes Records/Médiapop Records, 2016)
 This Land is Not Your Land  (Wobbly Ashes Records/Disques du 7e ciel, 2012)
 Drunk Women and Sexual Water (Wobbly Ashes Records/Anticraft, 2007)
 La Chanson du Zorro Andalou (Grosse Rose/Kerig, 2000)
 Overflow (Grosse Rose/Musidisc, 1997)
 The Confession (Absinthe/Bondage-France, 1995)
 Hunger of a Thin Man (Bondage-France, 1994)

With Passion Fodder
 And Bleed That River Dry 1985-1991 (Barclay/PolyGram-France/Beggars Banquet-World, 1998)
 Songs Sacred and Profane 1985-1991 (Barclay/PolyGram-France/Beggars Banquet-World, 1993)
 What Fresh Hell is This? (Barclay/PolyGram-France/Beggars Banquet-World, 1991)
 Woke Up This Morning  (Barclay/PolyGram-France/Beggars Banquet-World, 1989)
 Love, Waltzes and Anarchy (Barclay/PolyGram-France/Beggars Banquet-World, 1987)
 Fat Tuesday (Barclay/PolyGram-France/Beggars Banquet-World, 1986)
 Hard Words from a Soft Mouth (Barclay/PolyGram-France/Beggars Banquet-World, 1985)

With Orchestre Rouge
 More Passion Fodder  (RCA-France, 1983)
 Yellow Laughter' (RCA-France, 1982)

Production
Noir Désir - "Où veux-tu que je r'garde ?" (Barclay/PolyGram-France) –1987
E.V. - "Reuz" (Lola Label/PolyGramFrance) – 1994
Les Hurleurs - "Bazar" (Barclay/Universal) – 1996
Les Malpolis - "La Fin du retour de la chanson" (Willing/Mosaic Music) – 2005
Gecko Palace – "Tout va si bien" (New Track Music) – 2008

Film Music
"Babel metropolite," directed by Beajena Borakova – 1988
"Peaux de vaches," dir. Patricia Mazuy – 1989
"Perpetua," dir. Claudia Neubern – 1999
"La Fille préférée," dir. Lou Jeunet – 1999
"Les Petites Mains," dir. Lou Jeunet – 2001
"The Wind", dir. Victor Söjström (ciné-concert) - 2007 
"La Vallée de larmes," dir. Agathe Dronne – 2011
"Au bonheur des dames", dir. Julien Duvivier (ciné-concert) - 2013

Theatre
"Idaho Babylone," (Theo Hakola) scored reading based on the novel, with Dominique Reymond, Bénédicte Villain and Simon Texier; author/composer/musician... Grenoble, Frontignan – 2017
"American Tabloid," (James Ellroy) composer/musician – MC93-Bobigny – 20013. Directed by Nicolas Bigards.
"Rakia," (Theo Hakola) scored reading based on the novel, with Dominique Reymond; author/composer/musician... Dijon – 2013
"Sur la route," scored reading based on Jack Kerouac's On The Road, composer/musician... Manosque, Toulouse, Grenoble, Caen, Vendôme, Vincennes, Rennes – 2012–2015...
"La Ballade de Carson Clay," (Theo Hakola) scored reading based on La Valse des affluents, author/composer/musician... Grenoble, Bobigny – 2011-2015
"L'Invention du monde," (Olivier Rolin) –  composer/musician – at the MC93-Bobigny – 2010. Directed by Michel Deutsch.
"Chroniques du bord de scène - Hello America," 2009/10, followed by "USA, d'après Dos Passos" –  composer/musician/actor – at the MC93-Bobigny – 2009/10. Directed by Nicolas Bigards.
"Le Chant des âmes," scored reading based on Le Sang des âmes, author/composer/musician... Finnish Cultural Center, Paris – 2009.
"La Thébaïde" (Jean Racine) – composer/musician, Centre dramatique national de Montreuil and the Atelier du Rhin in Colmar – October/Novembre 2007. Directed by Sandrine Lanno.
"Ellen Foster" (Kaye Gibbons) –  composer/musician and translator in Dijon (Festival Frictions) and Lille (l’Aéronef) – 2002 then, as co-director, Bagnolet (l’Échangeur) and Lyon (Théâtre de la Renaissance) – 2005.
"Les Chansons de ‘La Valse des affluents’" (Theo Hakola) scored reading based on the novel, author/composer/musician... Manosque, Poitiers – 2004, and Lyon – 2005.
"Une Dizaine de morts," (based on the works of Michael Ondaatje), adapter-author/composer/musician... Lyon, Manosque – 2003, Paris, Lille – 2004
"La Chanson du Zorro andalou" (Theo Hakola) – author/actor/composer/director, 1999–2000, Rennes, Lille, Paris...
"Mahagonny" (Bertolt Brecht/Kurt Weill) – actor (Alaskawolf Joe), Paris and on tour in France... – 1983 Directed by Hans-Peter Cloos.

Radio/Journalism
D.J./producer on France Inter, Radio Monte Carlo (RMC Côte d'Azur), France Culture, Radio Nova and Radio Cité 96.
Publication of articles on European culture and politics in In These Times and in Cinéaste  (USA) and in La Règle du jeu, Libération, Actuel, Globe, Les Inrockuptibles... (France).

Education
The London School of Economics and Political Science – 1975/76
B.A. in Political History – Antioch College, Yellow Springs, Ohio – 1977

Other work
Film actor: (agent: Sophie Barrois/Agence Oz) Pictures, Florent Quint (2011), Suerte, Jacques Séchaud (2010); The Portuguese Man O' War, Lauren Makael (2008); Une Famille parfaite, Pierre Trividic (2006); Ma Mère, Christophe Honoré (2004); La Fille préférée, Lou Jeunet (1999)...
Director: “Reliefs” fiction workshop – Saint-Priest (Lyon), 2005 “La parole et les cris” lyrics workshop – Nevers, 1998–1999
Translator: Composition and Non-composition'' by Jacques Lucan (PPUR-2012) as well as numerous film scripts, plays, poems, songs and articles...
Organizational Secretary: The US Committee for a Democratic Spain, New York – 1975
Instructor: “The Spanish Civil War,” Antioch College, Ohio – 1974  “Photography,” (assistant to Tony Conrad) Antioch College, Ohio – 1974
Sound, lights, programming: Tramps Club, New York – 1977/78
English teacher, photographer, rewriter, waiter...

References

External links

1954 births
Living people
Musicians from Spokane, Washington
Antioch College alumni
Songwriters from Washington (state)
21st-century American novelists
American people of Finnish descent
American people of Swedish descent
Writers from Spokane, Washington
Novelists from Washington (state)